Weldon Historic District is a national historic district located at Weldon, Halifax County, North Carolina. It encompasses 256 contributing buildings, 2 contributing structures, and 9 contributing structures in the central business district and surrounding residential sections of the town of Weldon. The district includes notable examples of Queen Anne, Colonial Revival, and Bungalow / American Craftsman style architecture. The district overlaps the Roanoke Canal Historic District. Notable buildings include the Larkin-Hart House (c. 1871), Ashley L. Stainback House c. (1879), Smith-Dickens House (1901-1902), DeLeon F. Green House (1934) designed by William Lawrence Bottomley, Emry-Zollicoffer Building (1877), Bank of Weldon Building (c. 1895), George C. Green Building/Bank of Halifax Building (1915), Weldon Grocery Company Building (1913), (former) Weldon Town Hall (1893), United States Post Office (1938), Weldon Freight Depot (c. 1840), Coca-Cola Bottling Company (1925), and Atlantic Coast Line Railroad Embankment and Viaduct.

It was listed on the National Register of Historic Places in 1996.

References

Historic districts on the National Register of Historic Places in North Carolina
Queen Anne architecture in North Carolina
Colonial Revival architecture in North Carolina
Buildings and structures in Halifax County, North Carolina
National Register of Historic Places in Halifax County, North Carolina